Urchin is the first solo album by Inga Liljeström. It was independently released in 1998 under the name of "Inga". It was re-released through Groovescooter Records in 2007.

Track listing
"Holding Still" – 3:34
"Yellohead" – 3:47
"The Drowning Song" – 3:03
"Cut" – 3:18
"Coma" – 2:53
"Tightness" – 6:07
"Oxygen Boy" – 3:20
"Marmalade" – 1:24
"Coma Remix" – 3:18
"The Wait" – 1:28
"Deeper Things" - 4:20
"10 Smiles" - 3:25
"Touch Tongue" - 9:53
(includes hidden track)

Citations and references

1998 debut albums
Inga Liljeström albums